Elbow Valley may refer to:

 Elbow Valley, Alberta in Canada
 Elbow Valley, Queensland in Australia